Weissius capaciductus is a species of dugesiid triclad found in Australia.

References

Dugesiidae